Novosibirsk Psychiatric Hospital No. 3 is a psychiatric hospital located in Novosibirsk, Russia.

History
On June 29, 1929, the West Siberian Neuropsychiatric Dispensary was organized, serving patients of Novosibirsk and the Altai Krai.

In 1951, the dispensary was connected with Psychiatric Hospital No. 3 (Stalin Avenue, 35), and the Department of Mental Illness of the Novosibirsk Medical Institute was created on the basis of the psychiatric organization.

In 1957, the hospital moved to the complex of buildings of the former military camp (Red Barracks), built during the Tsarist period and located on Vladimirovskaya Street (Zheleznodorozhny District of Novosibirsk).

Departments
Three departments of the hospital are located in Novosibirsk, one department is located in the village of Karpysak (Toguchinsky District).

Head of the hospital
 Alla Zinina, head doctor of the psychiatric hospital, candidate of medical sciences.

Famous patients
 Varvara Bulgakova (1895–1956) is the sister of writer Mikhail Bulgakov, prototype for the character of Elena Turbina-Talberg in the novel "The White Guard". She died at the psychiatric hospital in 1956.

References

Hospitals in Novosibirsk
Zheleznodorozhny City District, Novosibirsk
Psychiatric hospitals in Russia
Hospitals built in the Soviet Union